Stęclówka is a settlement (colony) in Pomeranian Voivodeship, Poland, located in the Gmina Tczew, Tczew County.

History 
Between 1975 and 1998, the village was located in the Gdańsk Voivodeship.

References 

Tczew County